Vaterpolo klub Vojvodina is a professional water polo club based in Novi Sad, Serbia. As of 2021–22 season, the club competes in the Serbian League and Regional League A2.

Honours
Serbian League
Runners-up (4): 2008–09, 2009–10, 2010–11, 2016–17
 Third place (3): 2006–07, 2007–08, 2011–12
Serbian Cup
Runners-up (3): 2009, 2010, 2011

Season by season

In European competition
Participations in Champions League (Euroleague): 5x
Participations in Euro Cup (LEN Cup): 5x

Current squad
 Miloš Marinković
 Vojislav Mitrović
 Vladimir Čukić
 Nemanja Ubović
 Miloš Miličić
 Nemanja Matković
 Marko Ovuka
 Dušan Vasić
 Srđan Vuksanović
 Luka Petić
 Franko Geratović
 Aleksandar Njegovan
 Marko Crvenko
 Stefan Roganović
 Miloš Maksimović
 Dragoljub Rogač
 Nenad Bosančić
 Vladan Mitrović

Famous players
 Boris Vapenski
 Petar Ivošević
 Nemanja Ubović
 Aleksandar Njegovan
 Duško Pijetlović
 Miloš Ćuk
 Gojko Pijetlović

External links
 Official website 

LEN Euroleague clubs
Water polo clubs in Serbia
Sport in Novi Sad
SD Vojvodina